Pablo Armenteros (1894 – death date unknown) was a Cuban pitcher who played in the Negro leagues in the 1910s.

A native of Cienfuegos, Cuba, Armenteros played for the Cuban Stars (East) in 1916. In seven recorded appearances on the mound, he posted a 5.59 ERA in 46.2 innings.

References

External links
Baseball statistics and player information from Baseball-Reference Black Baseball Stats and Seamheads

1894 births
Year of death missing
Place of death missing
Cuban Stars (East) players
Baseball pitchers
People from Cienfuegos
Cuban expatriate baseball players in the United States